The Schleicher ASW 17 is a single-seat Open Class sailplane that was built by the German manufacturer Alexander Schleicher GmbH & Co and first flew in 1971. It replaced the ASW 12, and was replaced in 1981 by the ASW 22.

Design and development
The ASW 17 was designed by Gerhard Waibel, supposedly as a development of the Schleicher ASW 12, but was an entirely new design. The wing is in four sections. The camber-changing flaps are connected to the ailerons. It has Schempp-Hirth airbrakes plus an optional tail parachute. It first flew on 17 July 1971 and 55 were built before production stopped in 1976.

The ASW17 was succeeded by the ASW22.

Variants
In addition to the regular ASW 17, there is an ASW 17S which was a 21-metre span version built in 1973 but this was later reduced to 20m.  The ASW 17X was also a single aircraft that was built in 1976 with 19-metre span. One other was modified to 23 metres after production.

Competition history
ASW 17s came second in the World Gliding Championships in 1972, third in 1974. George Lee won in 1976 and in 1978 in an ASW 17.  Hans-Werner Grosse broke several world records in his ASW 17 including: the record goal flight at 1,231 km in 1974, the triangular distance record 1,063 km in 1977  and then again at 1,306.9 km, and the 1,250 km speed triangle at 133.24 km/h in 1980. Karl Striedeck broke another record by a flight of 1,634.7 km out and return in 1977 in an ASW 17.

Specifications (ASW 17)

See also

References
 Gliders and Sailplanes of the World by Michael Hardy – Ian Allan Ltd 1982 
 Sailplanes 1965–2000 by Martin Simons – Eqip

External links

Sailplane directory

1970s German sailplanes
Schleicher aircraft
Shoulder-wing aircraft
Aircraft first flown in 1971